The 2002 North Queensland Cowboys season was the 8th in the club's history. Coached by Murray Hurst and captained by Paul Bowman, they competed in the NRL's 2002 Telstra Premiership. Graham Murray replaced Hurst after three rounds and helped the club to their highest finish (11th) and most competition points (20) at the time.

Season summary 
The Cowboys underwent another rebuild in 2002 following a disastrous 2001 season. A number of players were moved on, with the key recruit being former Australian and Queensland winger Matt Sing. Sing was an instant success for the club, finishing the 2002 season as the team's top try scorer and being named their Player of the Year. He would later earn his way back into representative sides, becoming a club legend for the Cowboys, being named in their 10th and 20th Anniversary Teams and an inaugural inductee into their Hall of Fame in 2016.

The 2002 season began with three straight losses and looked to be even worse than the year before. Following their Round 3 defeat to the Melbourne Storm, coach Murray Hurst was sacked and replaced by former Sydney Roosters boss Graham Murray, who had taken the Roosters to the Grand Final just two years earlier. Another key piece of their rebuild, Murray would later lead the club to their first finals series and first Grand Final, and was their most successful head coach until the arrival of Paul Green.

Although the success was not instant, the signs were there, as the side won three of their first six games under Murray. Five straights losses soon followed, before ending the year with four wins from their final seven games, giving hope for the 2003 season. The club finished the regular season in 11th, their highest ever finish, with 20 competition points, also a record.

Off the field, Peter Parr joined the club as football manager for the 2002 season. A former administrator with the Perth Reds and Brisbane Broncos, Parr later held the positions of CEO and General Manager and was instrumental in the club's future successes and bringing players, such as Johnathan Thurston, to the club.

2002 also saw the retirement of club stalwart and foundation player Peter Jones, who held the club's most games record until 2004. Jones, the first player to play 100 games for the club, would remain on the Cowboys football operations staff until the end of 2012. While one club great retired, another emerged, with Aaron Payne making his debut in Round 12. Payne would go onto play 219 games for the club and start at hooker in their first ever Grand Final appearance in 2005.

Milestones 
 Round 1: Ken McGuinness, Matt Sing and David Thompson made their debuts for the club.
 Round 1: Matt Petersen made his NRL debut.
 Round 4: Ashley Alberts and Ty Williams made their NRL debuts.
 Round 5: Jaiman Lowe made his NRL debut.
 Round 7: Glenn Morrison played his 50th game for the club.
 Round 8: Nathan Fien played his 50th game for the club.
 Round 10: Ben Laity made his NRL debut.
 Round 12: Aaron Payne and Simon Phillips made their NRL debuts.
 Round 15: Tevita Amone made his debut for the club.
 Round 19: Derrick Watkins made his NRL debut.
 Round 21: Paul Bowman played his 100th game for the club.

Squad List

Squad Movement

2002 Gains

2002 Losses

Ladder

Fixtures

Regular season

Statistics 

Source:

Representatives 
The following players played a representative match in 2002.

Honours

Club 
 Player of the Year: Matt Sing
 Players' Player: Matt Sing
 Club Person of the Year: Martin Locke

Feeder Clubs

Queensland Cup 
  North Queensland Young Guns - 6th, missed finals

References 

North Queensland Cowboys seasons
North Queensland Cowboys season